Dream Tactix is the fifth studio album by J-pop duo Two-Mix, released as the duo's final album under King Records on September 23, 1998. It includes the singles "Beat of Destiny" (ending theme of the TV Asahi variety show U-chan Nan-chan no Honō no Challenger Kore ga Dekitara Hyakuman-en!!) and "Last Impression" (ending theme of the anime theatrical compilation Gundam Wing: Endless Waltz Special Edition).

The album peaked at No. 6 on Oricon's weekly albums chart.

Track listing 
All lyrics are written by Shiina Nagano; all music is composed by Minami Takayama; all music is arranged by Two-Mix.

Charts

References

External links 
 
 

1998 albums
Two-Mix albums
Japanese-language albums
King Records (Japan) albums